The police in Canada's ranks differ according to the different police forces and depend on different laws at the federal, provincial, and municipal levels.

Royal Canadian Mounted Police 

The rank system of the RCMP is partly a result of their origin as a paramilitary force. Upon its founding on February 1, 1920, the RCMP adopted the rank insignia of the Canadian Army (which in turn came from the British Army), which is almost identical to that of the current Canadian Army. Like in the military, the RCMP also has a distinction between commissioned and non-commissioned officers. The non-commissioned ranks are mostly based on military ranks (apart from constable). Non-commissioned officer ranks above staff sergeant resemble those that formerly existed in the Canadian Army but have since been replaced by warrant officers. The commissioned officer ranks, by contrast, use a set of non-military titles that are often used in Commonwealth police services. The number of higher ranks, like chief superintendent and a deputy commissioner, has been added to and increased since the formation of the force, while the lower commissioned rank of sub-inspector has been dropped.

Officers

Others

Parliamentary Protective Service 

The PPS uses a similar ranks system to the RCMP, with the director being a chief superintendent on secondment from the RCMP. The officer-in-charge of PPS operations holds the rank of superintendent, team managers hold the rank of sergeant, supervisors hold the rank of corporal, and officers with no leadership responsibility hold the rank of constable.

Alberta

Alberta Sheriffs Branch 
Peace officer ranks for the Alberta Sheriffs Branch:

Alberta Provincial Police 
The Alberta Provincial Police was a police force active in Alberta, Canada, from 1917 until 1932.

 Commissioner
 Superintendent
 Assistant superintendent
 Inspector
 Detective
 Sergeant
 Constable

Calgary Police Service

Edmonton Police Service

Lethbridge Police Service

British Columbia

British Columbia Sheriff Service

British Columbia Conservation Officer Service 

 Chief conservation officer
 Deputy chief conservation officer
 Inspector
 Staff sergeant
 Sergeant
 Conservation officer

British Columbia Commercial Vehicle Safety and Enforcement 

No traditional ranking system outside of the ceremonial unit is in place.
 Departmental sergeant major - 
 Troop sergeant - three chevrons
 - one chevron

Metro Vancouver Transit Police

New Westminster Police Department

Vancouver Police Department 

 Special municipal constable (traffic authority/jail guard/community safety personnel)

Manitoba

Winnipeg Police Service

New Brunswick

Newfoundland and Labrador

Royal Newfoundland Constabulary 
The Royal Newfoundland Constabulary is the provincial police service for the province of Newfoundland and Labrador.

Newfoundland Ranger Force 
The Newfoundland Ranger Force was the police force of the Dominion of Newfoundland before its confederation with Canada.

 Chief ranger
 Lieutenant
 Inspector
 Staff sergeant
 Sergeant
 Corporal
 Ranger 1st class
 Ranger 2nd class
 Ranger 3rd class

Northwest Territories

Nova Scotia 
Nova Scotia uses Sheriffs as well as RCMP and HRP.

Nunavut

Ontario

Ontario Provincial Police 
Rank structure within the Ontario Provincial Police is paramilitary or quasi-military in nature, with several "non-commissioned" ranks leading to the "officer" ranks. Detective ranks fall laterally with the uniform ranks and is not a promotion above. Police constables in the OPP are uniquely known as "provincial constables."

Historic now defunct ranks: 
 Staff superintendent 
 Divisional inspector
 Cadet

Toronto Police Service and York Regional Police 
The rank insignia of the Toronto Police Service is similar to that used by police services elsewhere in Canada and in the United Kingdom, except that the usual "pips" are replaced by maple leaves. The St. Edward's Crown is found on insignia of staff sergeant, all superintendent ranks and all commanding officer ranks. The same rank insignia are also used by the York Regional Police.

Ottawa Police Service

Peel Regional Police

Kingston Police

Cobourg Police Service 

 Detective sergeant
 Detective
 Detective constable

Durham Regional Police Service 

 Chief of police
 Deputy chief
 Chief administrative officer
 Superintendent
 Inspector
 Detective sergeant
 Staff sergeant
 Detective
 Sergeant
 Detective constable
 Senior constable
 Constable - 1st class
 Constable - 2nd class
 Constable - 3rd class
 Constable - 4th class
 Special court constables

Halton Regional Police Service 

 Chief of police
 Deputy chief
 Superintendent
 Inspector
 Staff sergeant / detective sergeant
 Sergeant / detective
 Police constable / detective constable

Waterloo Regional Police Service 

 Chief of police (crown and three maple leaves)
 Deputy chief (crown and two maple leaves)
 Superintendent (crown)
 Inspector (two maple leaves)
 Staff sergeant (crown and three chevrons)
 Sergeant (three chevrons)
 Constable

West Grey Police 

 Chief of police
 Sergeant
 Constable
 Auxiliary constable

Prince Edward Island

Quebec

Sûreté du Québec

Kativik Regional Police 

Service de police de la Ville de Montréal 
Ranks of the :

 Director
 Associate director
 Assistant director
 Chief inspector
 Inspector
 Commander
 Lieutenant / detective lieutenant (/)
 Quarter sergeant
 Sergeant / detective sergeant (/)
 Senior constable
 Constable

Service de police de la Ville de Laval 

 Director
 Associate director
 Assistant director
 Chief inspector
 Inspector
 Lieutenant / detective lieutenant (/)
 Sergeant / detective sergeant (/)
 Constable

Service de police de la Ville de Québec 

 Director
 Associate director
 Lieutenant
 Sergeant
 Constable

Saskatchewan

Regina Police Service Ranks 
The Regina Police Service Ranks is a police force in the Canadian province of Saskatchewan that 

 Chief of police
 Deputy chief
 Commissioner of police
 Assistant commissioner
 Inspector
 Sergeant
 Corporal
 Constable

Saskatoon Police Service 

 Chief
 Deputy chief
 Superintendent
 Inspector
 Staff sergeant
 Sergeant
 Constable
 Special constable

Yukon

Specialized police services

Niagara Parks Police Service 

 Chief of police
 Inspector
 Sergeant
 Constable
 Communications officer	
 Provincial offences officer

Toronto Community Housing Corporation Community Safety Unit 
The Community Safety Unit (CSU) is the law enforcement agency for Toronto Community Housing Corporation (TCHC).
 Chief special constable
 Deputy chief special constable
 Inspector (not currently in use)
 Staff sergeant
 Sergeant (platoon sergeant, field supervisor, administrative sergeant)
 Corporal (field intelligence officer, instructors, community safety advisors)
 Special constable
 Provincial offences officer

Nishnawbe-Aski Police Service 
The Nishnawbe-Aski Police Service (NAPS) is the police agency for Nishnawbe-Aski Nation (NAN).

 Chief of police
 Deputy chief
 Regional inspector / regional commander
 Administrative sergeant
 Staff sergeant
 Sergeant (detective sergeant, road sergeant)
 Constable (detective constable)

Transit Enforcement Unit 
The Transit Enforcement Unit (TEU; formerly known as the Special Constable Services Department) is the transit law enforcement and corporate security unit of the Toronto Transit Commission (TTC) in Toronto.

 Chief special constable
 Staff sergeant (patrol / system security / fare inspection / training and logistical support)
 Sergeant (patrol / fare inspection / training and logistical support)
 Special constable (patrol)
 Protective services guard (security / revenue protection)
 Fare inspector (provincial offences officer)

University of Toronto Campus Community Police Service 

 Director
 Associate director
 Staff sergeant
 Sergeant (rank currently not in use)
 Corporal (platoon / shift supervisor)
 Special constables / constables (1st to 4th class)
 Building patroller (security guard, not designated special constables)

Auxiliary police 
Different Canadian auxiliary police programs use various ranks, including some of the following:

 Auxiliary staff superintendent
 Auxiliary superintendent
 Auxiliary staff inspector
 Auxiliary inspector
 Auxiliary sergeant major
 Auxiliary staff sergeant
 Auxiliary sergeant
 Auxiliary constable

Former police forces

North-West Mounted Police

References 

Royal Canadian Mounted Police
Public Safety Canada
Gendarmerie
Uniformed services of Canada
Federal law enforcement agencies of Canada
Nunavut law
Northwest Territories law
Yukon law
Police ranks by country